Collio may refer to:

 Collio, Lombardy, Italy, a town
 Ivet Lalova-Collio (born 1984), Bulgarian sprinter
 Simone Collio (born 1979), Italian sprinter
 Collio Goriziano, also known as Collio, an Italian wine and winemaking region